Serotonin is the third studio album by Mystery Jets, released in the UK on 5 July 2010. The album is produced by Chris Thomas.

Track listing

References

2010 albums
Mystery Jets albums
Rough Trade Records albums
Albums produced by Chris Thomas (record producer)